Rob Moffat is a Scottish rugby union coach. He was the assistant coach at Edinburgh under Andy Robinson before taking over as head coach in 2009 and has been involved in coaching Scotland A, Glasgow Warriors and the Borders. On 31 January 2011 he was sacked by Edinburgh following a disappointing start to the season.

Career
As a PE teacher and head of department at Galashiels Academy Moffat taught the likes of Gregor Townsend, John Collins, Chris Paterson and Geoff Cross.

He went on to take over from Jim Telfer as the Melrose coach in the early 1990s before becoming assistant coach at the Borders when the game turned professional in 1997. When that team was merged with Edinburgh he joined Glasgow before returning to the borders when the team was revived.

When it was again disbanded in 2007 Moffat moved to Edinburgh where he was assistant under Robinson and coached Scotland A to the final of the 2008 Churchill Cup where they were defeated by England Saxons.

In July 2009 Moffat took over the head coach roll at Edinburgh following Robinson's appointment as head coach of the national side. In his first season they finished 6th in the Celtic League and failed to make progress from the pool stages of the Heineken Cup having won three of their matches.

The 2010 Magners campaign got off to a poor start with three losses on the trot before managing to overcome Leinster with a bonus point win at home in Murrayfield. By January Edinburgh had climbed to 7th but a home loss to the Scarlets and failure to progress in the Heineken Cup with only one win in six saw Moffat's time as head coach come to an end.

Moffat is now in charge of elite private school, Merchiston Castle School. First XV and is also Director of Rugby at the school. He left Merchiston Castle School at the end of the 2015-16 rugby season.

References

External links
 http://www.edinburghrugby.org/

Year of birth missing (living people)
Living people
Scottish rugby union coaches
Glasgow Warriors coaches
Scottish schoolteachers